"Guitar, Bass and Drums" is a series of three EPs by the British rock singer, Toby Jepson. Formerly a member of the British rock band, Little Angels, Jepson returned to the music industry in 2007.

As a stopgap, and to thank fans for their patience with the delayed EP3, Jepson released a handful of other songs (some of which had been marked as EP3 contenders) on his website.  These songs were "The Chosen One", "Hurts" and "Overwhelming Me".

Track listings

EP #1
Released on 23 March 2007.
 "Motivated"
 "Overloaded"
 "Somebody Else"
 "Happy Ever After"
 "Shine It On"

EP #2
Released in September 2007.
 "Ta-loo-la"
 "Money Goes (Ebb And Flow)"
 "Lucky"
 "Learn To Fly"
 "Doing The Best That I Can"

All tracks were written by Jepson.

EP #3
Released on 6 December 2010. 
 "Better Off Dead"
 "Small Talk"
 "Rear View Mirror"
 "Back in the Day"
 "Got To Have It"
 "Song With No Name"
 "Backslide" 
 "Gina"
 "Just No Way To Stop From Loving You"

Bonus tracks
"The Chosen One"
"Hurts"

External links
Jepson's official website
Jepson's official MySpace page

2007 EPs